Edmond Mondesir was born in Fort-de-France (Martinique) in 1948. Professor of Philosophy, talented writer and composer, he is also a recognized singer and an awarded « tanbou bélé » musician.

Biography 
After finishing his philosophy career he returned to his birthplace with the conviction of the existence of a rich musical tradition in Martinique. He then participates in many traditional groups and starts to investigate in the North Martinique’s provinces searching for the authentic Bèlé.

After this starting road, he creates with Léon Bertide the group Bèlènou in 1980 and records his first Bèlé’s album, with his own compositions and a traditional touch. In 1983, it comes out their second album, consecrated to modern instrumental Bèlé. Between 1980 and 2002 Edmond Mondésir makes nine productions, divided between traditional Bèlé and modern Bèlé, between sung bèlé and instrumental Bèlé.

During their 25 years career he performed with his group on the Martinica’s most prestigious stages. The artist’s fame expands all over the Caribbean and Latin America, and it was in a Cuban festival where he found the inspiration for the song "Santiago".

In 2003, he receives the SACEM award as a homenage to his whole work.

Today, Edmond Mondésir is an important pillar in the Bèlé music in Martinique. He is, at the same time, a defensor of this music’s authenticity and the executor of its modernization about the Bèlé spirit’s integrity. But more than an artist, he is a cultural militant that has been fighting for thirty years for the Maritinican to be proud of their cultural identity and get it back.

The first album with Manuel Mondésir: « Emosion Bèlè - Les chants du père, la musique du fils » (2006) made and arranged by his son Manuel is the symbol of a bridge between two generations, an exotic and calm trip over a music with roots and multiple aspects.

In 2008 the second collaboration with Manuel Mondésir : « Emosion Bèlè 2 - Hommage à Ti Emile ». It's a tribute to one of the greatest singer of bèlè Ti Emile (1925–1992).

In 2009, he released two albums "Sé Pou La viktwa Nou Ka Alé" and "Nou Pa Pè".

2011, marks the reissue of "Emosion Bèlè" [remastered album and credited with 5 new titles for the first time available in France] and the European tour of the artist.

In March 2011, Edmond Mondesir receives the "Prix France Musique des Musiques du monde 2011" award.

Discography

Bélénou discography 

 1980 : Bèlènou (Lanné Tala)
 1983 : Bèlènou (Chimen Tala)
 1987 : Syèl Kléré
 1990 : Emosyon Tambou-a
 1992 : An ti van frémi
 1998 : Janbé Lizyè
 2000 : Retrospektiv

Edmond Mondésir discography 

 1995 : Mélodi Bèlè
 2002 : Manmay Bèlè
 2006 : Emosion Bèlè - Les chants du père, la musique du fils (with Manuel Mondésir)
 2008 : Emosion Bèlè 2 - Hommage à Ti-Emile (with Manuel Mondésir)
 2009 : Sé Pou La Viktwa Nou Ka Alé
 2009 : Nou Pa Pè
 2011 : Emosion Bèlè (reissue remastered with 5 new tracks)

Bibliography 
 2004 : Les jours Innocents (aux Éditions Lafontaine).

References

External links 
 myspace.com/edmondmondesir
 Grioo.com : SWARE BELE le 21 mai 2005 invité spécial Edmond Mondésir
 Edmond & Manuel Mondésir - Le cri du peuple
 ARTISTES WOZLINES PRODUCTIONS
 Vibrations Caraibes - Les Mondésir
 Africultures - Biographie
 MILO POKO MO

Living people
Martiniquais musicians
1948 births